The 2023 Charlotte FC season is the club's second season in Major League Soccer, the top division of soccer in the United States. The team is coached by Christian Lattanzio.

Team information

Squad information

Appearances and goals are career totals from all-competitions as of October 9, 2022.

Roster transactions

In

Out

SuperDraft picks

Competitions

Exhibitions
Charlotte has been announced to be participating in the 2023 edition of the Coachella Valley Invitational.

Major League Soccer season

Eastern Conference

Overall

Results summary 

Updated to match(es) played on March 11, 2023.

Matches

U.S. Open Cup 

Charlotte FC will enter the 2023 edition of the U.S. Open Cup in the third round.

Leagues Cup 

Charlotte FC will make their debut in the Leagues Cup. On January 20, the groups for the tournament were determined with Charlotte drawn into Group South 4. This group also contains FC Dallas and Necaxa.

South 4

Statistics

Appearances and Goals 
Numbers after plus-sign(+) denote appearances as a substitute.

|-
! colspan="18" style=background:#dcdcdc; text-align:center| Goalkeepers 

|-
! colspan="18" style=background:#dcdcdc; text-align:center| Defenders 

|-
! colspan="18" style=background:#dcdcdc; text-align:center| Midfielders

|-
! colspan="18" style=background:#dcdcdc; text-align:center| Forwards

Goalscorers
{| class="wikitable" style="text-align:center"
|-
!width=15|
!width=15|
!width=15|
!width=15|
!width=175|Name
!width=80|MLS
!width=100|U.S. Open Cup
!width=100|Leagues Cup
!width=80|Total
|-
!1
|9
|FW
|
|Enzo Copetti
|1
|0
|0
|0
|-
! colspan="5" |Totals
!1
!0
!0
!0

Disciplinary record

References

Charlotte FC
Charlotte FC
Charlotte FC
Charlotte FC